Ranpur Taluka is a taluka of Botad district, in the state of Gujarat, India.  Prior to August 2013 it was part of Ahmedabad District.

Villages
Ranpur Taluka consists of thirty-four panchayat villages.

Notes and references

Botad district
Talukas of Gujarat